Acid Row is a 2001 novel by crime-writer Minette Walters. The novel examines contemporary reactions to paedophilia and resulting urban rioting, and was shortlisted for the Crime Writers' Association Gold Dagger.

External links
 More about Acid Row on Walters' website
 Agent's dedicated page

2001 British novels
Novels by Minette Walters
Pedophilia in literature
Macmillan Publishers books